This is the list of releases for Spartan Records by order of release.

Releases

References

External links

Alternative rock discographies
Discographies of American record labels